Sam Smith (born 9 August 1989) is an English former child actor. He played the title role in the 1999 ITV series Oliver Twist and played David Wiseman in the 2003 film Wondrous Oblivion.

References

External links

1989 births
Living people
English male film actors
English male television actors